Jacob Rives Pitts (born November 20, 1979) is an American television, film and stage actor. His most notable performances were as Cooper Harris in the film EuroTrip (2004), as Bill "Hoosier" Smith in the HBO miniseries The Pacific (2010), and as U.S. Marshal Tim Gutterson on the FX television drama Justified (2010–15). He appeared in the play Where Do We Live at the Vineyard Theatre in May 2004.  Pitts has also appeared in TV shows such as Law & Order, Ed and Sex and the City. He had a recurring role in the first season of The Sinner and is currently starring as Lance Lord in the crime drama series Sneaky Pete.

Early life
Pitts grew up in Weston, Connecticut, the son of Arlene and Joseph Rives Pitts. He described himself as a hyperactive child. In high school, he was involved in the theater production company, and took part in productions while he was in school, including a performance as the Mysterious Man in Into The Woods.

Career
Pitts began his career when he made his TV debut in 1999, and he appeared in an episode of Comedy Central's sitcom Strangers with Candy. He then went on to the New York Broadway stage in 2000, when he played Fleance from the Shakespearean play Macbeth. After his Broadway production, he was cast to appear in an episode each of Law & Order and Sex and the City. In 2004, he played a role in Eurotrip, and in 2008 was cast in 21.

In 2006, Pitts discussed his career motivations during an interview with Damien Echols:

Awards and honors
In 2008, Pitts was presented the Best Ensemble Award at the ShoWest Convention in the United States for his part in 21. The award was also presented to Jim Sturgess, Kevin Spacey, Kate Bosworth, Laurence Fishburne, Aaron Yoo, Liza Lapira, and Josh Gad for their parts in the movie.

Filmography

Personal life 
Pitts married Slovakian actress/director Tereza Nvotová in 2020. They reside in Bratislava, Slovakia.

References

External links

1979 births
Living people
American male film actors
American male television actors
People from Weston, Connecticut